Catus may refer to:

 Felis catus, the scientific name for cat
 Catus, Lot, a commune in France